The following is a list of Prague Metro stations, ordered alphabetically. Names in parentheses denote former station names from before 1990. The accessibility of the station for persons with impaired mobility and important places nearby are also given.

Lines

The green Line A connects the center with the northwest and east of the city. Travel time (from terminal to terminal) is about 20 minutes.

The yellow Line B is the longest; it goes from the southwest outskirts through the center and continues to the northeast of the city. Travel time (from end to end) is about 45 minutes.

The red Line C is the oldest and shallowest, going from the north to the south-east. Travel time is about 35 minutes.

Stations

Prague